The 1998 Ole Miss Rebels football team represented the University of Mississippi during the 1998 NCAA Division I-A football season.  They participated as members of the Southeastern Conference in the West Division.  Coached by Tommy Tuberville, the Rebels played their home games at Vaught–Hemingway Stadium in Oxford, Mississippi.

Schedule

Roster

References

Ole Miss
Ole Miss Rebels football seasons
Independence Bowl champion seasons
Ole Miss Rebels football